Lionel Frost Bowen, AC (28 December 1922 – 1 April 2012) was an Australian politician and senior Labor Party figure, serving in the ministries of Gough Whitlam and Bob Hawke. He was Deputy Prime Minister of Australia from 1983 to 1990.

Personal life
Bowen was born in the Sydney suburb of Ultimo. His father left the family when Bowen was aged 10 years and Bowen's mother looked after her invalid brother and elderly mother, while working as a cleaner. Bowen was educated at Cleveland Street public school, Marcellin College Randwick and Sydney University where he graduated with a LLB in 1946 and became a solicitor. He served in the Second Australian Imperial Force from 1941 to 1945, reaching the rank of corporal.

Bowen and his wife, Claire, married in 1953 and had three daughters and five sons. He lived in the same home in Kensington for 73 years. His son, Tony, was a mayor of the City of Randwick.

Political career
Bowen was elected to Randwick Council and became Mayor in 1948. He served in the New South Wales Legislative Assembly from 1962 to 1969, representing Randwick, before being elected to the Parliament of Australia in 1969, to the seat of Kingsford Smith in the House of Representatives. From 1972 to 1975, he served successively as Minister for Manufacturing Industry, Special Minister of State and Postmaster-General in the Whitlam cabinet.

Bowen played a relatively quiet role in politics, preferring to work behind the scenes. A significant achievement came when he served as acting education minister in the Whitlam government (during the illness and hospitalization of incumbent education minister Kim Beazley Senior), when he managed to split the opposition and win National Party support in the Senate for needs-based funding for non-government schools.

When Whitlam resigned as Labor leader after his defeat at the 1977 election, Bowen contested the party leadership but was defeated by Bill Hayden and became Deputy Leader. He retained this position when Bob Hawke became Leader in February 1983. When Hawke won the March 1983 election, Bowen became Deputy Prime Minister and Minister for Trade in the first Hawke Ministry. In July 1983, he was appointed Vice-President of the Executive Council and in the second Hawke ministry, he became Attorney-General, losing the Trade portfolio.

In 1988, Bowen sponsored four referendums to reform the Australian Constitution (see 1988 Australian referendum), but all were defeated. He retired from federal politics prior to the March 1990 election, and was succeeded as Deputy Prime Minister by Paul Keating.

Post political career
Bowen served as Chairman of the National Gallery of Australia between 1990 and 1995 and shared a strong interest in horseracing.

In 1990, he was awarded the New Zealand 1990 Commemoration Medal, and in 1991, he was appointed a Companion of the Order of Australia "in recognition of service to the community and politics." In 2001, he received a Centenary Medal.

Bowen died from pneumonia on 1 April 2012 after years afflicted with Alzheimer's disease. He was given a state funeral on 11 April 2012.

Legacy
The Family Court of Australia and the Federal Magistrates Court are located in the Lionel Bowen Building in Goulburn Street, Sydney. The City of Randwick main library is known as the Lionel Bowen Library. Lionel Bowen Park is situated in the suburb of Mascot.

Gallery

References 

 

 

1922 births
2012 deaths
1975 Australian constitutional crisis
Deputy Prime Ministers of Australia
Australian Labor Party members of the Parliament of Australia
Labor Right politicians
Members of the Australian House of Representatives for Kingsford Smith
Members of the Australian House of Representatives
Leaders of the Australian House of Representatives
Members of the Cabinet of Australia
Attorneys-General of Australia
Members of the New South Wales Legislative Assembly
Companions of the Order of Australia
Recipients of the Centenary Medal
Australian Army personnel of World War II
Deaths from Alzheimer's disease
Deaths from dementia in Australia
Deaths from pneumonia in New South Wales
Australian Labor Party members of the Parliament of New South Wales
20th-century Australian politicians
Mayors of Randwick
Councillors of Sydney County Council
Government ministers of Australia
Australian Army soldiers